Mold Golf Club (Welsh: Clwb Golff Yr Wyddgrug) is a golf club based just outside Pantymwyn at Flintshire, Wales. It is an 18-hole uplands course some 850 feet above sea level, with a practice ground and putting green. The Club welcomes members, new members and visitors alike, seven days a week.
The club was praised by Welsh Assembly Delyn AM Sandy Mewies recently while opening a new facility at the club; she said, "It is a top flight facility, similar to ones used by top players". The club was opened as "Hafod Golf Links" in 1905.

References

Golf clubs and courses in Wales
Golf club